Glenwood City High School is a public school serving grades 9 through 12 in Glenwood City, St. Croix County, Wisconsin, United States.

Officials
District Administrator: Tim Johnson
Athletic Director: Patrick Gretzlock
Principal:  Patrick Gretzlock

References

External links
Glenwood City School District
Glenwood City

Public high schools in Wisconsin
Schools in St. Croix County, Wisconsin